Andrea Mancini (born 13 August 1992) is an Italian footballer who plays as a forward or midfielder. He is the youngest son of Roberto Mancini.

Career

Internazionale Primavera
Mancini started his career at Inter Milan where his father was the first team coach. He started as a member of the Giovanissimi Regionali team in the 2005–06 season, and had moved up to the Allievi Regionali team for the 2007–08 season. The next season (2008–09), he left Inter for a loan spell with the Monza youth team, along with a number of other young Inter players that included his elder brother, Filippo. He was released from Inter as a free agent in June 2009.

Manchester City
Mancini was signed up by the Manchester City 'Under-21' youth team in November 2010
after he was released by his former club Bologna in Italy. He scored 3 goals for Bologna reserve.

Oldham Athletic (loan)
On 3 November 2011, Mancini started a one-month loan spell at Oldham Athletic along with his Elite Development Squad teammate Luca Scapuzzi. He made his debut two days later as a late substitute in the Latics' home defeat to local rivals Bury and was also an 85th-minute substitute for the home side in the Football League Trophy quarter-final game against Crewe Alexandra three days later. Mancini extended his loan for a further month despite only appearing twice as a substitute so far. Andrea Mancini was sent back to his parent club after a disappointing loan spell, only making two substitute appearances in two months for the club.

Return to Manchester City
After spells at Fano and Oldham Athletic on loan, Andrea returned to Manchester City. On 25 May 2012 Manchester City released Andrea. Andrea only spent a year at the English club making no senior appearances. Mancini was on trial with League One side Bournemouth during the 2012/13 pre-season.

Valladolid B
On 27 July 2012 Andrea signed a 1-year contract with Spanish club Real Valladolid B.

Budapest Honvéd
On 19 June 2013, Mancini was signed by Hungarian League club Budapest Honvéd. On 12 July 2013, Roberto Mancini watched his son live playing in the UEFA Europa League 2013–14 season against Čelik Nikšić. The match ended with a 9-0 victory for Budapest Honvéd.

On 29 October 2014, Mancini terminated his contract with Budapest Honvéd.

During his period in Budapest, Mancini played 23 matches and scored 2 goals. He made 11 appearances in the Hungarian League.

Szombathely
On 20 January 2015, Mancini was signed by Hungarian League club Szombathely.

D.C. United 

On 5 March 2016, Mancini signed with D.C. United of Major League Soccer.

New York Cosmos 

On 9 September 2016 Mancini signed with New York Cosmos of North American Soccer League.

Club statistics

Updated to games played as of 7 March 2016.

References

1992 births
Living people
Footballers from Genoa
Italian footballers
Association football forwards
Inter Milan players
Bologna F.C. 1909 players
Alma Juventus Fano 1906 players
Real Valladolid Promesas players
Manchester City F.C. players
Oldham Athletic A.F.C. players
Budapest Honvéd FC players
English Football League players
Nemzeti Bajnokság I players
D.C. United players
New York Cosmos (2010) players
North American Soccer League players
Italian expatriate footballers
Expatriate footballers in England
Expatriate footballers in Hungary
Expatriate soccer players in the United States
Italian expatriate sportspeople in England
Italian expatriate sportspeople in Hungary
Italian expatriate sportspeople in the United States